This is a following list of the MTV Movie & TV Award winners and nominees for Best Performance in a Show. The category debuted in 2017 when the ceremony began jointly celebrating cinema and television under the name Best Actor in a Show.

Winners and nominees

2010s

2020s

Multiple wins and nominations
The following individuals received multiple wins:

The following individuals received multiple nominations:

References

MTV Movie & TV Awards